This is a list of works by the Italian composer Tomaso Albinoni (1671–1751).

Vocal music

Operas
Most of Albinoni's works were dramma per musica, but only two of them still exist in a complete form: Zenobia, regina de' Palmireni and La Statira.

Intermezzi
(Vespetta e) Pimpinone (Pietro Pariati), Venice 1708
Malsazio e Fiammetta (unidentified), Rome 1726 (text and music lost)
Il Satrapone (Antonio Salvi), P 1729 (music lost)
L'impresario delle Isole Canarie (Pietro Metastasio) 1725 (music lost)

Serenate
Il nascimento dell’Aurora (unidentified), Venice 1715
Il nome glorioso in terra, santificato in cielo (Vincenzo Cassani), Venice 1724
Il concilio de’ pianeti (Girolamo Baruffaldi), Venice 1729

Cantatas
12 Cantate da camera a voce sola, op. 4 (for voices and bass continuo), Venice 1702
No. 1: Amor, Sorte, Destino (for soprano)
No. 2: Da l’arco d’un bel ciglio (for alto)
No. 3: Del chiaro rio (for soprano)
No. 4: Riedi a me, luce gradita (for alto)
No. 5: Lontananza crudel, mi squarci il core (for soprano)
No. 6: Filli, chiedi al mio core (for alto)
No. 7: Ove rivolgo il piede (for soprano)
No. 8: Mi dà pena quando spira (for alto)
No. 9: Parti, mi lasci, ah quale (for soprano)
No. 10: Son qual Tantalo novello (for alto)
No. 11: Poiché al vago seren di due pupille (for soprano)
No. 12: Chi non sa quanto inumano (for alto)
18 Cantatas for Soprano and Bass continuo, Staatsbibliothek Berlin, ms. 447
No. 1: Il bel ciglio d’Irene
No. 2: Già dal mar sorgea l’alba
No. 3: Amarissime pene, suonate ormai
No. 4: (as op. 4 no. 5)
No. 5: Sorgea col lume in fronte
No. 6: Lontan da te, mia vita
No. 7: Sovra letto d’erbette
No. 8: (as op. 4 no. 11)
No. 9: Il penar senza speranza
No. 10: Senti, bel sol, deh senti
No. 11: Quest’è l’ora fatale
No. 12: Di tante ree sciagure
No. 13: Fileno, caro amico
No. 14: Sovra molle origliere
No. 15: Clori nel ciel d’amor lucida stella
No. 16: Dubbio affetto il cor mi strugge (Amante timido)
No. 17: Rivolse Clori un giorno
No. 18: Donna illustre del Latio
Other cantatas
Bel fantasmo tu fosti al mio pensiero (for soprano and bass continuo)
Bella, perché tu forsi (for soprano and bass continuo)
Biondo crin, occhio nero, e sen d’avorio (for soprano and bass continuo)
Che ne dici, che risolvi (for soprano and bass continuo)
Crudelissimo amore (for alto and bass continuo)
Dove sei, che fai cor mio (for soprano and bass continuo)
E dove, Amor, mi guidi (for soprano, instruments and bass continuo)
Fatto bersaglio eterno (for alto and bass continuo)
Già tornava l’aurora
In alta rocca, ove d’un genio amico (for soprano and bass continuo)
Io che per colpa sol del fatio rio (for soprano and bass continuo)
Là dove il nobil Giano (for soprano and bass continuo)
Quanta pietà mi date, o mesti fiori (for soprano and bass continuo)
Senza il core del mio bene (for soprano or alto and bass continuo)
Vorrei che lo sapessi (for alto and bass continuo)
Vorrei scoprir l’affanno (for soprano and bass continuo)

Religious music
Messa a tre voci (for 2 tenors and bass, a cappella), before 1694
I trionfi di Giosuè (Oratorium; Text: Giovanni Pietro Berzini), Florence 1703 (together with Alessandro Scarlatti, Giovanni Bononcini et al.)
Maria annunziata (Oratorium; Text: Francesco Silvani), Florence 1712

Instrumental music

With opus numbers
Op. 1: 12 Sonate a tre (for 2 violins and basso continuo), Venice 1694
 No. 1 in D minor
 No. 2 in F major
 No. 3 in A major
 No. 4 in G minor
 No. 5 in C major
 No. 6 in A minor
 No. 7 in G major
 No. 8 in B minor
 No. 9 in D major
 No. 10 in F minor
 No. 11 in E minor
 No. 12 in B-flat major
Op. 2:  (for solo violin (in concertos only), 2 violins, 2 violas and basso continuo), Venice 1700
 Sonata No. 1 in G major
 Concerto No. 1 in F major
 Sonata No. 2 in C major
 Concerto No. 2 in E minor (=BWV Anh. 23)
 Sonata No. 3 in A major
 Concerto No. 3 in B-flat major
 Sonata No. 4 in C minor
 Concerto No. 4 in G major
 Sonata No. 5 in B-flat major
 Concerto No. 5 in C major
 Sonata No. 6 in G minor
 Concerto No. 6 in D major
Op. 3: 12 Balletti a tre (for 2 violins and basso continuo), Venice 1701
 No. 1 in C major
 No. 2 in E minor
 No. 3 in G major
 No. 4 in A major
 No. 5 in D minor
 No. 6 in F major
 No. 7 in D major
 No. 8 in C minor
 No. 9 in G minor
 No. 10 in E major
 No. 11 in A minor
 No. 12 in B-flat major
Op. 5: 12 Concerti a cinque (for solo violin, 2 violins, 2 violas and basso continuo), Venice 1707
 No. 1 in B-flat major
 No. 2 in F major
 No. 3 in D major
 No. 4 in G major
 No. 5 in A minor
 No. 6 in C major
 No. 7 in D minor
 No. 8 in F major
 No. 9 in E minor
 No. 10 in A major
 No. 11 in G minor
 No. 12 in C major
Op. 6: 12 Trattenimenti armonici per camera (for violin and basso continuo), Amsterdam c. 1711
 No. 1 in C major
 No. 2 in G minor
 No. 3 in B-flat major
 No. 4 in D minor
 No. 5 in F major
 No. 6 in A minor
 No. 7 in D major
 No. 8 in E minor
 No. 9 in G major
 No. 10 in C minor
 No. 11 in A major
 No. 12 in B-flat major
Op. 7: 12 Concerti a cinque (for solo violin, 1 or 2 oboes, 2 violins, viola, cello and basso continuo), Amsterdam 1715
 No. 1 in D major
 No. 2 in C major (for 2 oboes)
 No. 3 in B-flat major (for oboe)
 No. 4 in G major
 No. 5 in C major (for 2 oboes)
 No. 6 in D major (for oboe)
 No. 7 in A major
 No. 8 in D major (for 2 oboes)
 No. 9 in F major (for oboe)
 No. 10 in B-flat major
 No. 11 in C major (for 2 oboes)
 No. 12 in C major (for oboe)
Op. 8: 6 Balletti & 6 Sonate a tre (for 2 violins and basso continuo), 1722
 Sonata No. 1 in B-flat major
 Balletto No. 1 in D minor
 Sonata No. 2 in A major
 Balletto No. 2 in F major
 Sonata No. 3 in C major
 Balletto No. 3 in D major
 Sonata No. 4 in G minor
 Balletto No. 4 in B-flat major
 Sonata No. 5 in F major
 Balletto No. 5 in C major
 Sonata No. 6 in C minor
 Balletto No. 6 in G minor
Op. 9: 12 Concerti a cinque (for solo violin, 1 or 2 oboes, 2 violins, viola, cello and basso continuo), Amsterdam 1722
 No. 1 in B-flat major (for violin)
 No. 2 in D minor (for oboe)
 No. 3 in F major (for 2 oboes)
 No. 4 in A major (for violin)
 No. 5 in C major (for oboe)
 No. 6 in G major (for 2 oboes)
 No. 7 in D major (for violin)
 No. 8 in G minor (for oboe)
 No. 9 in C major (for 2 oboes)
 No. 10 in F major (for violin)
 No. 11 in B-flat major (for oboe)
 No. 12 in D major (for 2 oboes)
Op. 10: 12 Concerti a cinque (for solo violin, 2 violins, viola, cello and basso continuo), Amsterdam 1735/36
 No. 1 in B-flat major
 No. 2 in G minor (for violin)
 No. 3 in C major
 No. 4 in G major (for violin)
 No. 5 in A major
 No. 6 in D major (for violin)
 No. 7 in F major
 No. 8 in G minor (for violin)
 No. 9 in C major
 No. 10 in F major (for violin)
 No. 11 in C minor
 No. 12 in B-flat major (for violin)
Op. 11: Sonate a tre (for two violins and basso continuo), c. 1739 (not published) (lost)

Without opus numbers

Sinfonias
Si 1: Sinfonia in D major for the first act of Zenobia (for natural trumpet, 2 violins, 2 violas, cello and basso continuo), 1694
Si 2: Sinfonia in F major for the first act of Engelberta (for 2 violins, 2 violas, cello and basso continuo), 1709
Si 3: Sinfonia in A major (for 2 violins, viola, violone, and basso continuo), c. 1707–15
Si 4: Sinfonia in D major (for 2 violins, viola and basso continuo; manuscript versions for 2 oboes and bassoon), c. 1707–15
Si 5: Sinfonia in A major (for 2 violins, viola and basso continuo), c. 1707–15
Si 6: Sinfonia in B major (for 2 violins, viola, bassoon and basso continuo), c. 1715–22
Si 7: Sinfonia in G minor (for 2 flutes, 2 oboes, 2 violins, 2 violas, bassoon and basso continuo), c. 1715–22
Si 8: Sinfonia in G major (for 2 violins, viola and basso continuo), c. 1722–35
Si 9: Sinfonia in F major (for 2 violins, viola and basso continuo), c. 1722–35

Concertos
Co 1: Concerto in D major (for solo violin, 2 violins, viola, violone and basso continuo), before 1700
Co 2: Concerto in C major (for solo violin, 2 violins, viola and basso continuo), c. 1717
Co 3: Concerto in D major (for solo violin and strings), c. 1715–22
Co 4: Concerto in G major (for 1 or 2 solo violins, 2 violins, viola and basso continuo), c. 1717
Co 5: Concerto in A major adapted by Pisendel (for solo violin, 2 violins, viola and basso continuo), c. 1717

Sonatas
So 1: Sonata a sei con tromba in C major (for natural trumpet, 2 violins, 2 violas and basso continuo), c. 1700
So 2–7: Balletti a cinque (for 2 violins, 2 violas and basso continuo), c. 1702
So 2: Balletto 1 in B-flat major
So 3: Balletto 2 in G minor
So 4: Balletto 3 in E minor
So 5: Balletto 4 in F minor
So 6: Balletto 5 in A major
So 7: Balletto 6 in F major
So 8–19: Balletti a quattro (for 2 violins, viola and basso continuo), c. 1700
So 8: Balletto 1 in G major
So 9: Balletto 2 in B minor
So 10: Balletto 3 in D major
So 11: Balletto 4 in A major
So 12: Balletto 5 in C major
So 13: Balletto 6 in E minor
So 14: Balletto 7 in F major
So 15: Balletto 8 in A minor
So 16: Balletto 9 in B-flat major
So 17: Balletto 10 in D minor
So 18: Balletto 11 in E major
So 19: Balletto 12 in G minor
So 20–25: Sonate a tre (for 2 violins and basso continuo), before 1700
So 20: Sonata 1 in C major
So 21: Sonata 2 in B-flat major
So 22: Sonata 3 in F major
So 23: Sonata 4 in D major
So 24: Sonata 5 in G major
So 25: Sonata 6 in A major
So 26–31: Sonate da chiesa ("op. 4") (for violin and basso continuo), Amsterdam 1708
So 26: Sonata 1 in D minor
So 27: Sonata 2 in E minor
So 28: Sonata 3 in B-flat major
So 29: Sonata 4 in G minor (spurious)
So 30: Sonata 5 in G minor
So 31: Sonata 6 in B minor
So 32: Sonata a violino solo composta per il Sig. Pisendel in B-flat major (for violin and basso continuo), c. 1717
So 33: Solo in G minor (for violin and basso continuo), c. 1717
So 34: Solo in B-flat major (for violin and basso continuo), c. 1717
So 35–39: Sonate a violino solo e basso continuo (for violin and basso continuo), Amsterdam c. 1717
So 35: Sonata 1 in D minor
So 36: Sonata 2 in G minor
So 37: Sonata 3 in A major
So 38: Sonata 4 in A major
So 39: Sonata 5 in E minor (spurious)
So 40–45: Six sonates da camera (op. post.) (for violin and basso continuo), Paris c. 1740
So 40: Sonata 1 in F major (spurious)
So 41: Sonata 2 in A minor
So 42: Sonata 3 in E major (spurious)
So 43: Sonata 4 in D minor (spurious)
So 44: Sonata 5 in D major (spurious)
So 45: Sonata 6 in A major

References

Michael Talbot: "Tomaso Albinoni", Grove Music Online ed. L. Macy (Accessed June 25, 2005), (subscription access)
Michael Talbot: Tomaso Albinoni. The Venetian Composer and His World. Clarendon Press, Oxford 1990. S. 271–281.

 
Albinoni